Marko Popadić (born 30 August 1989) is a Serbian professional basketball player for Gilbertina Soresina of the C gold, Italy.

Professional career 
A point guard, Popadić played for Crvena zvezda, Al Ittihad Tripoli, Tamiš, Smederevo 1953, SEFA Arkadikos, Egis Körmend, PVSK Veolia, Clavijo, Holargos, Šentjur, Šenčur GGD, Terme Olimia Podčetrtek, Mladost SP and Gilbertina Soresina.

Personal life 
His father Miša is a basketball coach, and his mother Vesna Popadić is retired handball player.

References

External links
 Marko Popadic at eurobasket.com
 Marko Popadic at realgm.com
 Marko Popadic at proballers.com
 Marko Popadic at aba-liga.com

1989 births
Living people
ABA League players
Arkadikos B.C. players
Basketball League of Serbia players
BC Balkan Botevgrad players
BC Körmend players
CB Clavijo players
Holargos B.C. players
Hungarian people of Serbian descent
Hungarian expatriate basketball people in Greece
Hungarian expatriate basketball people in Serbia 
Hungarian expatriate basketball people in Spain
Hungarian men's basketball players
KK Crvena zvezda players
KK Mladost SP players
KK Smederevo players
KK Tamiš players
KK Šentjur players
Point guards
PVSK Panthers players
Serbian expatriate basketball people in Bulgaria
Serbian expatriate basketball people in Greece
Serbian expatriate basketball people in Hungary
Serbian expatriate basketball people in Slovenia
Serbian expatriate basketball people in Spain
Serbian men's basketball players
Sportspeople from Pančevo